Dry Run is a tributary of the Lehigh River in Northampton County, Pennsylvania, in the United States. The stream is designated as a Coldwater Fishery and a Migratory Fishery. It is often dry.

Course
Dry Run begins in a flat area west of Sauerkraut Hill in Allen Township. It flows south for several tenths of a mile before crossing Pennsylvania Route 329 and continuing to flow south. The stream eventually begins to gradually turn southwest and enters Northampton. Here, it flows west-southwest for a few tenths of a mile before turning southwest for several tenths of a mile. The stream then reaches its confluence with the Lehigh River.

Geography and geology

Watershed
The stream is entirely within the United States Geological Survey quadrangle of Catasauqua.

Polluted stormwater in Allen Township has the potential to impact Dry Run. However, an NPDES permit was once issued for discharge of stormwater into the stream, associated with construction activities. The stream frequently is dry.

History
Dry Run was entered into the Geographic Names Information System on August 2, 1979. Its identifier in the Geographic Names Information System is 1173531.

In 1787, Christian Schwartz constructed a large stone house at the mouth of Dry Run.

A lost Pratt through truss bridge was once built over Dry Run for the Lehigh Valley Transit Co. Historically, a trolley bridge crossed the stream and a school was located near this bridge. In 2014, the Delaware and Lehigh National Heritage Corridor received $217,000 from the Pennsylvania Department of Community and Economic Development to replace a pedestrian bridge over the stream.

Biology
The drainage basin of Dry Run is designated as a Coldwater Fishery and a Migratory Fishery.

See also
Coplay Creek, next tributary of the Lehigh River going downriver
Hokendauqua Creek, next tributary of the Lehigh River going upriver
List of rivers of Pennsylvania

References

Tributaries of the Lehigh River